Enteromius usambarae is a species of ray-finned fish in the  family Cyprinidae.
It is found only in Tanzania.
Its natural habitat is freshwater marshes.

References

Enteromius
Endemic freshwater fish of Tanzania
Taxa named by Einar Lönnberg
Fish described in 1907
Taxonomy articles created by Polbot